The MÁV Class V63 "Gigant" series are  made by Ganz for MÁV to haul heavy freight and passenger trains with high tractive effort. This is the most powerful type of locomotive that have been made in Hungary.

History
The first and second prototype units were delivered in 1975 (V63 001, V63 002). Both of these prototype units used electrical equipment from Western Europe while the later units used exclusively Hungarian made equipment. The null-series (V63 003, V63 004, V63 005, V63 006, V63 007) were delivered between 1980 and 1981.
From 1984 the new units have been equipped with new bogies with better running performance licensed from Krupp. In total, 56 units have been delivered to MÁV. Of these, 51 units are still running.

In 2006, the V63 048, V63 138, V63 151 were equipped with ETCS, for testing purposes.

References

External links
 V63 profile and high quality pictures on Trainspo

Electric locomotives of Hungary
25 kV AC locomotives
Co′Co′ locomotives
Railway locomotives introduced in 1975
Standard gauge locomotives of Hungary
Co′Co′ electric locomotives of Europe